The Seattle International Film Festival (SIFF), held annually in Seattle, Washington since 1976, is among the top film festivals in North America.  Audiences have grown steadily; the 2006 festival had 160,000 attendees. The SIFF runs for more than three weeks (24 days), in May/June, and features a diverse assortment of predominantly independent and foreign films, and a strong contingent of documentaries.

SIFF 2006 included more than 300 films and was the first SIFF to include a venue in neighboring Bellevue, Washington, after an ill-fated early attempt. However, in 2008, the festival was back to being entirely in Seattle, and had a slight decrease in the number of feature films. The 2010 festival featured over 400 films, shown primarily in downtown Seattle and its nearby neighborhoods, and in Renton, Kirkland, and Juanita Beach Park.

History

The festival began in 1976 at a then-independent cinema, the Moore Egyptian Theater, under the direction of managers Jim Duncan, Dan Ireland, and Darryl Macdonald. The first SIFF featured  "Hedda," with Glenda Jackson, Louis Malle’s "Black Moon," Luis Buñuel's "Phantom of Liberty." The Rocky Horror Picture Show was the unnamed secret "sneak preview." The Third Festival in 1978 was the first under the direction of Rajeeve Gupta. It doubled the number of films and increased the audience by 50% over the Second festival. The first five festivals were held at The Moore Egyptian. Currently, the Moore Theatre is back under its earlier name and functioning as a concert venue. When founders Dan Ireland and Darryl Macdonald of the Moore Egyptian lost their lease, they founded the Egyptian theater in a former Masonic Temple on Seattle's Capitol Hill. The Egyptian theater remains a prime festival venue to this day, although the festival now typically uses about half a dozen cinemas (including, since 2007, its own SIFF Cinema at Seattle Center), with the exact roster varying from year to year.

During the 1980s, SIFF audiences developed a reputation for appreciating films that did not fit standard industry niches, such as Richard Rush's multi-layered The Stunt Man (1980). SIFF was instrumental in the entry of Dutch films into the United States market, including the first major American debut for director Paul Verhoeven.

The nature of the festival

The festival includes a component that is unique among major film festivals: a four-film "Secret Festival". Those who attend the Secret Festival do not know in advance what they will see, and they must sign an oath that they will not reveal afterward what they have seen.

In general, SIFF has a reputation as an "audience festival" rather than an "industry festival". The festival often partially overlaps the Cannes Film Festival, which can reduce attendance by industry bigwigs; in 2007 there were two days of overlap, May 24 and 25.

The SIFF group also curates the Global Lens film series, the Screenwriters Salon, and Futurewave (K-12 programming and youth outreach), coordinates SIFF-A-Go-Go travel programs (organized tours to other film festivals) and co-curates the 1 Reel Film Festival at Bumbershoot and the Sci-Fi Shorts Film Festival at the Science Fiction Museum and Hall of Fame.

In 2006, Longhouse Media launched the SuperFly Filmmaking Experience, in partnership with the Seattle International Film Festival, which brings youth together from diverse backgrounds to work collaboratively on film projects that promote awareness of indigenous issues and mutual understanding of each other's cultures. Fifty youth from across the United States arrive in Seattle to then travel to a local Pacific Northwest reservation to create 4 films in 36 hours.

SIFF Cinema
November 28, 2006, SIFF and Seattle mayor Greg Nickels announced that SIFF would soon have a home and a year-round screening facility in what has been the Nesholm Family Lecture Hall of McCaw Hall, the same building at Seattle Center that houses the Seattle Opera. The city contributed $150,000 to the $350,000 project. This auditorium was a "flagship venue" for SIFF festivals and the site of most press screenings.

Shortly after the 2011 festival, SIFF moved its operations to the SIFF Film Center on the Seattle Center campus.  The Film Center includes a 90-seat multi-use theater, multi-media classroom, exhibition spaces, archives, and offices for SIFF and the Film School. In October 2011, SIFF Cinema moved from McCaw Hall to its current location in the Uptown Theater.  SIFF utilizes all three of the Uptown's three screens for year-round programming.  SIFF currently has year-round programming for four screens in Seattle.

In May 2014 it was announced that SIFF had purchased the Uptown Theater, and would be leasing and renovating the Egyptian Theater (abandoned roughly a year earlier by Landmark Theatres) from Seattle Central College.

Awards 

Since 1985, the Seattle International Film Festival has awarded the Golden Space Needle award each year to the festival's most popular movie. Ballots are cast by audience members at the end of each movie. Previous winners of the Golden Space Needle include Whale Rider for 2003, Trainspotting for 1996, Kiss of the Spider Woman for 1985 and Boyhood for 2015, the latter two being the only films to be nominated for the Academy Award for Best Picture and win the Golden Space Needle.

Golden Space Needle (Best Film) and SIFF Awards for Best Short and Documentary 
{| class="wikitable"
|-
!Year	
!Best Film (Golden Space Needle)
!Best Short	
!Best Documentary
|-
|1985
|Kiss of the Spider Woman (dir. Héctor Babenco, Brazil)
|Frankenweenie (dir. Tim Burton, United States)
|rowspan="6"| 
|-
|1986
|The Assault (dir. Fons Rademakers, Netherlands)
|The Big Snit (dir. Richard Condie, USA)
|-
|1987
|My Life as a Dog (dir. Lasse Hallström, Sweden)
|Your Face (dir. Bill Plimpton, USA)	
|-
|1988
|Bagdad Café (dir. Percy Adlon, West Germany)
|Ray's Male Heterosexual Dance Hall (dir. Jonathon Sanger, USA)
|-
|1989
|Apartment Zero (dir. Martin Donovan, USA)
|Tin Toy (dir. John Lasseter, USA)
|-
|1990
|Pump Up the Volume (dir. Allan Moyle, USA)
|Knick Knack (dir. John Lasseter, USA)
|-
|1991
|My Mother's Castle (dir. Yves Robert, France)
|The Potato Hunter (dir. Timothy Hittle, USA)
|Paris Is Burning (dir. Jennie Livingston, USA)
|-
|1992
|IP 5 - L'île aux pachydermes (dir. Jean-Jacques Beineix, France)
|Anima Mundi (dir. Godfrey Reggio, USA)	
|A Brief History of Time (dir. Errol Morris, USA)
|-
|1993
|The Wedding Banquet (dir. Ang Lee, Taiwan/USA)
|The Fairy Who Didn't Want to Be a Fairy Anymore (dir. Laurie Lynd, Canada)
|Road Scholar (dir. Roger Weisberg, USA)
|-
|1994
|Priscilla, Queen of the Desert (dir. Stephan Elliott, Australia)
|The Wrong Trousers (dir. Nick Park, UK)
|The Wonderful, Horrible Life of Leni Riefenstahl (dir. Ray Müller, Germany)
|-
|1995
|The Kingdom (dir. Lars von Trier, Denmark)
|Surprise! (dir. Veit Helmer, Germany)
|Crumb (dir. Terry Zwigoff, USA)
|-
|1996
|Trainspotting (dir. Danny Boyle, UK)
|That Night (dir. John Keister, USA)
|Hype! (dir. Doug Pray, USA)
|-
|1997
|Comrades: Almost a Love Story (dir. Peter Chan, Hong Kong)
|Ballad of the Skeletons (dir. Gus Van Sant, USA)
|Licensed to Kill (dir. Arthur Dong, USA)
|-
|1998
|God Said Ha! (dir. Julia Sweeney, USA)
|Sin Sostén (dir. Rene Castinello, Antonio Urrutia, Belgium)
|Frank Lloyd Wright (dir. Ken Burns, Lynn Novick, USA)
|-
|1999
|Run Lola Run (dir. Tom Tykwer, Germany)
|12 Stops of the Road to Nowhere (dir. Jay Lowi, USA)
|Buena Vista Social Club (dir. Wim Wenders, USA)
|-
|2000
|Shower (Zhang Yang, China)
|In God We Trust (dir. Jason Reitman, USA)
|Trade Off (dir. Shaya Mercer, USA)
|-
|2001
|Finder's Fee (dir. Jeff Probst, USA)
|Boychick (dir. Glen Gaylord, USA)
|The Endurance: Shackleton's Legendary Antarctic Expedition (dir. George Butler, USA)
|-
|2002
|Elling (dir. Petter Næss, Norway)
|The Host (dir. Nicholas Tomnay, Australia)
|Ruthie & Connie: Every Room in the House (dir. Deborah Dickson, USA)
|-
|2003
|Whale Rider (dir. Niki Caro, New Zealand)
|Misdemeanor (dir. Jonathan Lemond, USA)
|The Revolution Will Not Be Televised (dir. Kim Bartley, Donnacha O'Briain, Ireland/Venezuela)
|-
|2004
|Facing Windows (dir. Ferzan Özpetek, Italy)
|Consent (dir. Jason Reitman, USA)
|Born into Brothels (dir. Zana Briski, Ross Kauffmann, USA)
|-
|2005
|Innocent Voices (dir. Luis Mandoki, Mexico)
|Raftman's Razor (dir. Keith Bearden, USA)
|Murderball (dir. Henry-Alex Rubin, Dana Adam Shapiro, USA)
|-
|2006
|OSS 117: Nest of Spies (dir. Michel Hazanavicius, France)
|Full Disclosure (dir. Douglas Horn, USA)
|The Trials of Darryl Hunt (dir. Ricki Stern, Annie Sundberg, USA)
|-
|2007
|Outsourced (dir. John Jeffcoat, USA)
|Pierre (dir. Dan Brown, USA)
|For the Bible Tells Me So (dir. Daniel Karslake, USA)
|-
|2008
|Cherry Blossoms (dir. Doris Dörrie, Germany)
|Felix (dir. Andreas Utta, Germany)
|The Wrecking Crew (dir. Denny Tedesco, USA)
|-
|2009
|Black Dynamite (dir. Scott Sanders, USA)
|Wallace and Gromit: A Matter of Loaf and Death (dir. Nick Park, UK)
|The Cove (dir. Louie Psihoyos, USA)
|-
|2010
|The Hedgehog (dir. Mona Achache, France)
|Ormie (dir. Rob Silvestri, Canada)
|Ginny Ruffner: A Not So Still Life (dir. Karen Stanton, USA), Waste Land (dir. Lucy Walker, United Kingdom)
|-
|2011
|Pájaros de papel (dir. Emilio Aragón, Spain)
|The Fantastic Flying Books of Mr. Morris Lessmore (dir. William Joyce and Brandon Oldenburg, USA)
|To Be Heard (dir. Amy Sultan, Roland Legiardi-Laura, Edwin Martinez and Deborah Shaffer, USA)
|-
|2012
|Any Day Now (dir. Travis Fine, USA)
|CatCam (dir. Seth Keal, USA)
|The Invisible War (dir. Kirby Dick, USA)
|-
|2013
|Fanie Fourie's Lobola (dir. Henk Pretorius, South Africa)
|Spooners (dir. Bryan Horch, USA)
|Twenty Feet from Stardom (dir. Morgan Neville, USA)
|-
|2014
|Boyhood (dir. Richard Linklater, USA)
|Fool's Day (dir. Cody Blue Snider, USA)
|Keep on Keepin' On (dir. Alan Hicks, USA)
|-
|2015
|The Dark Horse (dir. James Napier Robertson, New Zealand)
|Even the Walls (dir. Sarah Kuck, Saman Maydani, USA)
|Romeo Is Bleeding (dir. Jason Zeldes, USA)
|-
|2016
|Captain Fantastic (dir. Matt Ross, USA)
|Alive & Kicking: The Soccer Grannies of South Africa (dir. Lara-Ann de Wet,  USA, South Africa)
|Gleason (dir. Clay Tweel, USA)
|-
|2017
|At the End of the Tunnel (dir. Rodrigo Grande, Spain/Argentina)
|Defend the Sacred (dir. Kyle Bell, USA)
|Dolores (dir. Peter Bratt, USA)
|-
|2018
|Eighth Grade (dir. Bo Burnham, USA)
|Emergency (dir. Carey Williams, USA)
|Won't You Be My Neighbor? (dir. Morgan Neville, USA)
|-
|2019
|Tel Aviv on Fire (dir. Sameh Zoabi, Israel)
|Stepdaddy (dir. Lisa Steen, USA)
|We are the Radical Monarchs (dir. Linda Goldstein Knowlton, USA)
|-
|2020
| colspan="3" |Not awarded -- Festival cancelled due to COVID-19 Pandemic
|}

 SIFF Awards for Best Director, Actress and Actor 

 Jury awards 

 Premieres 

Among the films that have received North American or world premieres at SIFF are:
 Alien – Ridley Scott (1979, World premiere)Arafat, My Brother – Rashid Masharawi (2005, North American premiere)Banlieue 13 – Pierre Morel (2005, North American premiere)Burning in the Wind – Silvio Soldoni (2003, World premiere)Cafe Society  – Woody Allen (2016, North American premiere)
 Creature – Parris Patton (1999, World premiere)Ghost World – Terry Zwigoff (2001, World premiere)I Murder Seriously – Antonio Urrutia (2003, North American premiere)
 Joshua Tree, 1951: A Portrait of James Dean – Matthew Mishory (2012, World Premiere)
 Last Days – Gus Van Sant (2005, North American premiere)
 Mars – Anna Melikian (2005, North American premiere)
 Mongolian Ping Pong – Ning Hao (2005, North American premiere)
 Monster House – Gil Kenan (2006, North American premiere)
 Nate Dogg – Thomas Farone (2003, World premiere)
 PTU – Johnny To (2003, North American premiere)
 Time Trap – Mark Dennis & Ben Foster (2017, World Premiere)
 Tomorrow's Weather – Jerzy Stuhr (2003, North American premiere)
 Twice in a Lifetime'' (1985, world premiere)

Gala Event films

Seattle

Kirkland

Renton

See also 

 List of film awards

References

External links 

 
 Official SIFF Flickr Page
 SIFF celebrates 30 years of movies (2006)

Film festivals in Washington (state)
Festivals in Seattle
Lists of films by award
Film festivals established in 1976
Awards established in 1985
1976 establishments in Washington (state)
1985 establishments in Washington (state)
Nonprofit cinemas and movie theaters in the United States